Thomas Horace McGuire (April 21, 1849 – July 13, 1923) was a Canadian judge.

Thomas Horace McGuire was born on April 21, 1849, in Kingston, Ontario. He attended Queen's University from 1866 to 1870, graduating with a Bachelor of Arts. McGuire was called to the bar of Ontario in 1875 and became a queen's counsel in 1883. Before his appointment to the bench, he practised law in Kingston. 

He became a justice of the Supreme Court of the Northwest Territories on April 25, 1887, as a member of its first panel. He was named the first chief justice of the Northwest Territories on February 18, 1902 until his retirement one year later on January 3, 1903.

McGuire died on July 13, 1923, in Prince Albert, Saskatchewan.

Notes

Sources 
 

1849 births
1923 deaths
Canadian King's Counsel
People from Kingston, Ontario
Queen's University at Kingston alumni
19th-century Canadian judges
20th-century Canadian judges